Sebastian Monroe may refer to:

 Sebastian Monroe (model), American fashion model
 Sebastian Monroe (Revolution), character in Revolution